TheSuitest was a hotel price-comparison website based in California. The site aggregated data from third party travel websites and displayed it in lists and interactive graphs.  The site was acquired by ClickTripz in 2015 and was subsequently deactivated.

History 
TheSuitest was co-founded in 2012 in Venice Beach, California by Jeremy Murphy (CEO), a former analyst in the investment management division of Goldman Sachs, and Mike Aucoin (CTO), a former software developer for Microsoft and DreamWorks. After a series of disappointing hotel stays, the pair designed algorithms to cull and analyze billions of room prices and amenities from third party sources, which would become TheSuitest.

Description 
The search engine compares hotel rooms based on granular amenities such as square footage, television size, view, bathtub type, dining areas, industry awards, and consumer ratings. Users can sort and filter hotel rooms based on a suite score (how a room measures-up to its peers based on the size, amenities, view and hotel quality) and deal grade (how the price of the room compares with its statistical fair value). Users can also opt to incorporate common fees into prices, including in-room WiFi, parking, and resort fees. When the website launched, it covered the 30 most popular tourist cities in the United States of America.

References 

American travel websites